MLX is a series of machine language entry utilities published by the magazines COMPUTE! and COMPUTE!'s Gazette, as well as books from COMPUTE! Publications.  These programs were designed to allow relatively easy entry of the type-in machine language listings that were often included in these publications.  Versions were available for the Commodore 64, VIC-20, Atari 8-bit family, and Apple II. MLX listings were reserved for relatively long machine language programs such as SpeedScript, some high-performance utilities, and fast-paced games.

First version

MLX was introduced in the December 1983 issue of COMPUTE! for the Commodore 64 and Atari 8-bit family (necessary to input the Atari game Chopperoids on Pg 122), and simultaneously in the December 1983 issue of COMPUTE!'s Gazette  to be used for the entry of two C-64 machine language games, the  excellent Spike (Pg 74) and the competitive Space Duel (Pg 80). 

This was followed by a version in the January 1984 issue of COMPUTE!'s Gazette, for the VIC-20 with 8K expansion, which was necessary to enter the VIC-20 version of the SpeedScript word processor.

MLX was in high demand when it was first introduced as the February 1984 issue of COMPUTE!'s Gazette contained the amazingly frantic Astro Panic! (Pg 68) for the C-64.

The March 1984 COMPUTE!'s Gazette issue featured Tiny MLX, a customised version specifically modified to allow typing in the game CUT-OFF! (Pg 46) on an unexpanded VIC-20.

The Bug Swatter column in the March 1984 COMPUTE!'s Gazette contained corrections for MLX program listings from the December 1983 and January 1984 COMPUTE!'s Gazette magazines. These corrections also applied to the 64 MLX that had been printed in the December 1983 COMPUTE! issue but never appeared in the CAPUTE! column. Both the January 1984 COMPUTE! and Gazette MLX listings reflected the same changes but, strangely, lines 210 and 215 were different in the updated versions.

Similarly, the CAPUTE! column in the March 1984 COMPUTE! Magazine  featured a correction for the Atari MLX from the December 1983 issue.

In the Commodore version, beginning in the May 1984 issue of COMPUTE!, several keyboard keys are redefined to create a makeshift numeric keypad.

These versions used a format consisting of six data bytes in decimal format, and a seventh as a checksum. The program auto-increments the address and prints the comma delimiters every three characters. Invalid keystrokes are ignored.

Improved version
A new version of MLX was introduced for the Apple II in the June 1985 issue.  This version uses an 8-byte-per-line hexadecimal format. A more sophisticated algorithm was implemented to catch errors overlooked by the original.

The improved features were then backported to the Commodore 64. The new version, known on the title screen as "MLX II", but otherwise simply as "the new MLX", appeared in the December 1985 issue of COMPUTE!.  It was printed in COMPUTE!'s Gazette the following month.  This version of MLX was used until COMPUTE!'s Gazette switched to a disk-only format in December 1993.

A version of MLX for the Commodore 128 first appeared on Page 89 of the August 1986 Compute!'s Gazette  for entry of TurboDisk 128 (Pg 68) and 128 Sprite Rotator (Pg 74). The March 1987 COMPUTE!  featured the Commodore 128 version of MLX (Pg 126) in conunction with 128 File Viewer (Pg 100).

See also
 The Automatic Proofreader – COMPUTE!'s checksum utility for BASIC programs

References

External links
Machine Language Editor for Atari and Commodore

Apple II software
VIC-20 software
Atari 8-bit family software
Commodore 64 software
Machine code